Rungroj Thainiyom (born 16 December 1986) is a para table tennis player from Thailand. He has won a gold medal at the 2012 Summer Paralympics and a bronze medal at the 2016 Summer Paralympics. He was the first Thai to win a Paralympic gold medal in table tennis.

He has muscular dystrophy.

References

Living people
Paralympic medalists in table tennis
Table tennis players at the 2008 Summer Paralympics
Table tennis players at the 2012 Summer Paralympics
Table tennis players at the 2016 Summer Paralympics
Table tennis players at the 2020 Summer Paralympics
Medalists at the 2012 Summer Paralympics
Medalists at the 2016 Summer Paralympics
Medalists at the 2020 Summer Paralympics
1986 births
Rungroj Thainiyom
Rungroj Thainiyom
People with muscular dystrophy
Rungroj Thainiyom
Rungroj Thainiyom
Rungroj Thainiyom
FESPIC Games competitors
Rungroj Thainiyom
Rungroj Thainiyom